Hyblaea flavipicta is a moth in the family Hyblaeidae described by George Hampson in 1910. A material sample of it was found on the southeast coast of Kenya.

References

Hyblaeidae